Sadiq Abad is a town in Khar Bajaur Tehsil, Bajur, Khyber Pakhtunkhwa, Pakistan. The population is 10,060 according to the 2017 census.

References 

Populated places in Bajaur District